Allergic contact dermatitis (ACD) is a form of contact dermatitis that is the manifestation of an allergic response caused by contact with a substance; the other type being irritant contact dermatitis (ICD).

Although less common than ICD, ACD is accepted to be the most prevalent form of immunotoxicity found in humans. By its allergic nature, this form of contact dermatitis is a hypersensitive reaction that is atypical within the population. The mechanisms by which these reactions occur are complex, with many levels of fine control. Their immunology centres on the interaction of immunoregulatory cytokines and discrete subpopulations of T lymphocytes.

Signs and symptoms
The symptoms of allergic contact dermatitis are very similar to the ones caused by irritant contact dermatitis, which makes the first even harder to diagnose. The first sign of allergic contact dermatitis is the presence of the rash or skin lesion at the site of exposure. Depending on the type of allergen causing it, the rash can ooze, drain or crust and it can become raw, scaled or thickened. Also, it is possible that the skin lesion does not take the form of a rash but it may include papules, blisters, vesicles or even a simple red area. The main difference between the rash caused by allergic contact dermatitis and the one caused by irritant contact dermatitis is that the latter tends to be confined to the area where the trigger touched the skin, whereas in allergic contact dermatitis the rash is more likely to be more widespread on the skin.  Another characteristic of the allergic contact dermatitis rash is that it usually appears after a day or two after exposure to the allergen, unlike irritant contact dermatitis that appears immediately after the contact with the trigger.

Other symptoms may include itching, skin redness or inflammation, localized swelling and the area may become more tender or warmer. If left untreated, the skin may darken and become leathery and cracked. Pain can also be present. Dermatitis can occur anywhere on the skin, but is most common on the hands (22% of people), scattered across the body (18%), or on the face (17%).

The rash and other symptoms typically occur 24 to 48 hours after the exposure; in some cases, the rash may persist for weeks.  Once an individual has developed a skin reaction to a certain substance it is most likely that they will have it for the rest of their life, and the symptoms will reappear when in contact with the allergen.

Cause
Common allergens implicated include the following: 
 Bacitracin – topical antibiotic found by itself, or as Polysporin or Triple Antibiotic
 Balsam of Peru (Myroxylon pereirae) – used in food and drink for flavoring, in perfumes and toiletries for fragrance, and in medicine and pharmaceutical items for healing properties; derived from tree resin.  It may also be a component of artificial vanilla and/or cinnamon flavorings.  
 Chromium – used in the tanning of leather.  Also a component of uncured cement/mortar, facial cosmetics and some bar soaps.
 Cobalt chloride – metal found in medical products; hair dye; antiperspirant; metal-plated objects such as snaps, buttons or tools; and in cobalt blue pigment
 Colophony (Rosin) – rosin, sap or sawdust typically from spruce or fir trees
 Formaldehyde – preservative with multiple uses, e.g., in paper products, paints, medications, household cleaners, cosmetic products, and fabric finishes.  Often released into products by the use of formaldehyde releasers such as imidazolidinyl urea, diazolidinyl urea, Quaternium-15, DMDM Hydantoin, and 2-bromo-2-nitropropane-1,3-diol.
 Fragrance mix – group of the eight most common fragrance allergens found in foods, cosmetic products, insecticides, antiseptics, soaps, perfumes, and dental products 
 Gold (gold sodium thiosulfate) – precious metal and compound often found in jewelry and dental materials
 Isothiazolinones – preservatives used in many personal care, household, and commercial products.
 Mercaptobenzothiazole – in rubber products, notably shoes, gloves, and car tires.
 Neomycin – topical antibiotic common in first aid creams and ointments, cosmetics, deodorant, soap, and pet food.  Found by itself, or in Neosporin or Triple Antibiotic
 Nickel (nickel sulfate hexahydrate) – has been recognized as a significant cause of allergy.  This metal is frequently encountered in stainless steel cookware, jewelry and clasps or buttons on clothing. Current estimates gauge are that roughly 2.5 million US adults and 250,000 children suffer from nickel allergy, which costs an estimated $5.7 billion per year for treatment of symptoms. A significant portion of nickel allergy is preventable.
 p-Phenylenediamine (PPD) - although it's mainly used as a component of engineering polymers and composites like kevlar, it is also an ingredient in hair dyes which once sensitized to, becomes lifelong. One can develop active sensitization to products, including but not limited to black clothing, various inks, hair dye, dyed fur, dyed leather, and certain photographic products. 
 Photographic developers, especially those containing metol
 Quaternium-15 – preservative in cosmetic products (self-tanners, shampoo, nail polish, sunscreen) and in industrial products (polishes, paints and waxes).
 Sap from certain species of mangrove and agave
 Soluble salts of platinum – see platinosis
 Thiomersal – mercury compound used in local antiseptics and in vaccines
 Topical anesthetics – such as pramoxine or diphenhydramine, after prolonged use
 Topical steroid – see steroid allergy
 Urushiol – oily coating from plants of Toxicodendron genus –  poison ivy, poison oak, and poison sumac. Also found in mango plants, mango skin, cashews, and smoke from burning urushiol-containing plants, which can cause skin as well as severe lung irritation.

Mechanism
ACD arises as a result of two essential stages: an induction phase, which primes and sensitizes the immune system for an allergic response, and an elicitation phase, in which this response is triggered. As it involves a cell-mediated allergic response, ACD is termed a Type IV delayed hypersensitivity reaction, making it an exception in the usage of the designation "allergic," which otherwise usually refers to type I hypersensitivity reactions.

Contact allergens are essentially soluble haptens (low in molecular weight) and, as such, have the physico-chemical properties that allow them to cross the stratum corneum of the skin. They can only cause their response as part of a complete antigen, involving their association with epidermal proteins forming hapten-protein conjugates. This, in turn, requires them to be protein-reactive.

The conjugate formed is then recognized as a foreign body by the Langerhans cells (LCs) (and in some cases other Dendritic cells (DCs)), which then internalize the protein; transport it via the lymphatic system to the regional lymph nodes; and present the antigen to T-lymphocytes. This process is controlled by cytokines and chemokines – with tumor necrosis factor alpha (TNF-α) and certain members of the interleukin family (1, 13 and 18) – and their action serves either to promote or to inhibit the mobilization and migration of these LCs. As the LCs are transported to the lymph nodes, they become differentiated and transform into DCs, which are immunostimulatory in nature.

Once within the lymph glands, the differentiated DCs present the allergenic epitope associated with the allergen to T lymphocytes. These T cells then divide and differentiate, clonally multiplying so that if the allergen is experienced again by the individual, these T cells will respond more quickly and more aggressively.

White et al. have suggested that there appears to be a threshold to the mechanisms of allergic sensitisation by ACD-associated allergens (1986). This is thought to be linked to the level at which the toxin induces the up-regulation of the required mandatory cytokines and chemokines. It has also been proposed that the vehicle in which the allergen reaches the skin could take some responsibility in the sensitisation of the epidermis by both assisting the percutaneous penetration and causing some form of trauma and mobilization of cytokines itself.

Memory response
Once an individual is sensitized to an allergen, future contacts with the allergen can trigger a reaction, commonly known as a memory response, in the original site of sensitization.  So for example if a person has an allergic contact dermatitis on the eyelids, say from use of makeup, touching the contact allergen with the fingers can trigger an allergic reaction on the eyelids.

This is due to local skin memory T-cells, which remain in the original sensitization site.  In a similar fashion, cytotoxic T lymphocytes patrol an area of skin and play an important role in controlling both the reactivation of viruses (such as the "cold sore" virus) and in limiting its replication when reactivated.  Memory response, or "Retest Reactivity", usually takes 2 to 3 days after coming in contact with the allergen, and can persist for 2 to 4 weeks.

Diagnosis
Diagnosing allergic contact dermatitis is primarily based on physical exam and medical history. In some cases doctors can establish an accurate diagnosis based on the symptoms that the patient experiences and on the rash's appearance. In the case of a single episode of allergic contact dermatitis, this is all that is necessary.  Chronic and/or intermittent rashes which are not readily explained by history and physical exam often will benefit from further testing.

A patch test (contact delayed hypersensitivity allergy test) is a commonly used examination to determine the exact cause of an allergic contact dermatitis.  According to the American Academy of Allergy, Asthma, and Immunology, "patch testing is the gold standard for contact allergen identification".

The patch test consists of applying small quantities of potential allergens to small patches and which are then placed on the skin. After two days, they are removed and if a skin reaction occurred to one of the substances applied, a raised bump will be noticeable underneath the patch.  The tests are again read at 72 or 96 hours after application.

Patch testing is used for patients who have chronic, recurring contact dermatitis. Other tests that may be used to diagnose contact dermatitis and rule out other potential causes of the symptoms include a skin biopsy and culture of the skin lesion.

Treatment
The clinical expression of the dermatitis can be mitigated by avoidance of the allergen.  Through compliance with avoidance measures, the immune system can become less stimulated.  The key to avoidance is proper evaluation and detection of the inciting allergen. However, once the immune system registers the allergen, the recognition is permanent.

The first step in treating the condition is appropriate recognition of the clinical problem, followed by identification of the culprit chemical and the source of that chemical. Corticosteroid creams should be used carefully and according to the prescribed directions because when overused over longer periods of time they can cause thinning of the skin. Also, in some instances such as poison ivy dermatitis calamine lotion and cool oatmeal baths may relieve itching.

Usually, severe cases are treated with systemic corticosteroids which may be tapered gradually, with various dosing schedules ranging from a total of 12 – 20 days to prevent the recurrence of the rash (while the chemical allergen is still in the skin, up to 3 weeks, as well as a topical corticosteroid. Tacrolimus ointment or pimecrolimus cream can also be used additionally to the corticosteroid creams or instead of these. Oral antihistamines such as diphenhydramine or hydroxyzine may also be used in more severe cases to relieve the intense itching via sedation. Topical antihistamines are not advised as there might be a second skin reaction (treatment associated contact dermatitis) from the lotion itself.

The other symptoms caused by allergic contact dermatitis may be eased with cool compresses to stop the itching. It is vital for treatment success that the trigger be identified and avoided. The discomfort caused by the symptoms may be relieved by wearing smooth-textured cotton clothing to avoid frictional skin irritation or by avoiding soaps with perfumes and dyes. Commonly, the symptoms may resolve without treatment in 2 to 4 weeks but specific medication may hasten the healing as long as the trigger is avoided. Also, the condition might become chronic if the allergen is not detected and avoided.

Identification of the allergen can be aided by the site of the dermatitis. Allergic dermatitis of the hands is often due to contact with preservatives, fragrances, metals, rubber, or topical antibiotics. Dermatitis at the front of the face is often due to gold (from jewelry and foundation), make-up, moisturizers, wrinkle creams, and topical medication. Along the eyelids as well as the sides of the head and neck, dermatitis is often caused by shampoo and conditioner dripping down from the hair. Inflammation on one side of the face often suggests transfer of an allergen from the hands or from the face of a partner.

Epidemiology 
Allergic contact dermatitis is common, affecting up to 20% of all people. People sensitive to one allergen are at an increased risk of being sensitive to others. Family members of those with allergic contact dermatitis are at higher risk of developing it themselves. Women are at higher risk of developing allergic contact dermatitis than men.

References

External links 

Contact dermatitis